Macrometopia atra is a species of hoverfly in the family Syrphidae.

Distribution
Chile, Argentina.

References

Eristalinae
Insects described in 1865
Diptera of South America
Taxa named by Rodolfo Amando Philippi